The following is a list of alumni of the Royal College of Art, London, and of its predecessor schools before 1896: the Government School of Design or Metropolitan School of Design, the Normal Training School of Art and the National Art Training School.

A

 Kristian Aadnevik, fashion designer
 Faisal Abdu'allah, printmaker
 Gerald Abramovitz
 M. R. Acharekar, painter, art director
 Jane Ackroyd, sculptor
 Norman Ackroyd
 Mark Adams (designer)
 David Adjaye, architect
 Edgar Ainsworth (artist)
 Griselda Allan
 Charlie Allen (designer)
 Kathleen Allen
 W. H. Allen
 Anthea Alley
 Helen Allingham, painter
 Edward Allington
 Victor Ambrus, illustrator
 Hurvin Anderson
 Kay Anderson 
 Marie Angel (artist)
 Peggy Angus
 Pascal Anson
 Lorenzo Apicella
 Leonard Appelbee, painter
 Billy Apple, artist and designer
 Val Archer, painter
 Princess Louise, Duchess of Argyll
 Audrey Arnott
 Pamela Ascherson
 Ruth Spencer Aspden
 Katerina Athanasopoulou, film maker and animation artist
 Frank Auerbach, painter
 Robert Austin (artist)
 Maxwell Ayrton, architect

B

 Marjorie May Bacon
 Joseph Ridgard Bagshawe
 Fred Baier
 Christopher Bailey (fashion designer)
 Alfred Lys Baldry
 Barbara Banister
 Tom Barker (designer)
 Jonathan Barnbrook, typographer and graphic designer
 Brian Barnes (artist)
 Glenys Barton
 Michael Bartlett
 Pauline Baumann  
 Lewis Baumer
 Edward Bawden
 Arlon Bayliss, visual artist
 John Beard (artist)
 Cressida Bell, textile designer
 Peter Bellamy
 John Bellany
 Sebastian Bergne, industrial designer
 Christine Berrie, illustrator
 Arthur Berry (playwright)
 Clara Billing, sculptor
 Dora Billington
 Helen Binyon
 Henry Bird, muralist
 Sutapa Biswas
 David Blackburn (artist), landscape artist
 William Kay Blacklock
 Doris Blair
 Peter Blake, painter
 Quentin Blake, cartoonist, author and illustrator
 Douglas Bliss
 Eric Boman, photographer
 Tord Boontje industrial designer
 Allen Boothroyd, industrial designer
 Nicholas Borden, painter
 Deirdre Borlase, painter
 Derek Boshier, painter
 Pauline Boty
 Doris Boulton-Maude
 Denis Bowen
 Moya Bowler
 Frank Bowling, painter
 William Bowyer (artist)
 Alan Boyson, muralist
 Boyd Webb
 John Bratby
 Kathleen Bridle
 John Frederick Brill
 Alison Britton
 Iris Brooke
 Jason Brooks (illustrator)
 Frederick Brown (artist)
 Percy Brown (art historian)
 Ralph Brown (sculptor)
 Sheilagh Brown, fashion designer
 William Kellock Brown, sculptor
 Kathleen Browne (artist)
 John Brunsdon
 Kenneth Budd
 John Bunting (sculptor)
 Victor Burgin, 1986 Turner Prize nominee
 Edward Burra
 James Butler (artist)

C

 Charles William Cain, artist
 Joyce W. Cairns
 Ian Callum
 Moray Callum
 Louise Camrass
 Gillian Carnegie, 2005 Turner Prize nominee
 David Carpanini, painter and printmaker
 Henry Carr, painter
 George Bertram Carter
 Michelle Cartlidge, illustrator
 James Castle (sculptor)
 Catherine Dean (artist)
 Patrick Caulfield, 1987 Turner Prize nominee
 Joseph Hermon Cawthra, sculptor
 George Chakravarthi, artist
 Jack Bridger Chalker, painter
 Catherine Chalmers
 Lu Chao
 Charles Chaplin (artist)
 Jake and Dinos Chapman, 2003 Turner Prize nominees
 Malvina Cheek, artist
 Bernard Cheese
 Marvin Gaye Chetwynd
 Gordon Cheung
 Emma Chichester Clark
 Madeleine Child
 Betty Churcher, director of the National Gallery of Australia, 1990–1997
 John Clappison, ceramic and glass designer
 Ossie Clark, fashion designer
 Bob Carlos Clarke
 Sir George Clausen, painter
 Benjamin Clemens, sculptor
 Clarice Cliff, ceramic designer, modeller and sculptor
 Sue Coe, political artist
 Ernest A. Cole, sculptor and printmaker
 Freda Coleborn
 Cecil Collins
 Elisabeth Collins
 Richard Cook, painter
 Jean Cooke, artist
 May Louise Greville Cooksey, painter
 Eileen Cooper
 Susie Cooper, ceramic designer
 Marcus Cornish
 Lucy Cousins
 Jack Coutu, printmaker and sculptor
 Jenny Cowern
 Raymond Teague Cowern
 Hilda Cowham
 Raymond Coxon, painter
 Roderick Coyne, sculptor
 Stuart Craig, production designer
 Tony Cragg, 1988 Turner Prize winner
 Andrew Cranston
 Reed Crawford
 Keith Critchlow
 Stella Rebecca Crofts
 Edward Cronshaw
 Neisha Crosland, textile designer
 Victoria Crowe
 Bill Culbert, painter, sculptor, photographer
 Frederick Cuming (artist)
 Michael Cumming, director, filmmaker
 Charles Cundall, war artist

D

 Anna Dabis
 Dexter Dalwood
 Jill Daniels
 Leonard Daniels
 Adam Dant, 2002 Jerwood Prize winner
 Leslie Davenport, artist and teacher
 Alki David
 Shezad Dawood
 David Dawson (painter)
 Lucienne Day
 Robin Day (designer)
 Richard Deacon, sculptor, 1987 Turner Prize winner
 Roger Dean (artist)
 Len Deighton, historian and author
 Elise D'Elboux 
 Thomas Derrick (artist)
 Mukul Dey, painter, engraver
 Ted Dicks
 Emilia, Lady Dilke, art historian
 Jane Dillon, designer and artist
 Emmy Dinkel-Keet
 Austin Dobson, poet
 Christopher Dresser, designer
 Conrad Dressler, sculptor and potter
 Lilian Dring
 Barry Driscoll
 William Harold Dudley
 Thomas Cantrell Dugdale
 Evelyn Dunbar, artist
 Jacqueline Durran
 Ian Dury, musician, singer
 James Dyson, designer

E

 Harry Eccleston
 Mildred Eldridge
 Nabil El-Nayal
 Frederick Vincent Ellis
 Tom Ellis (architect)
 David Emanuel (fashion designer)
 Joseph Emberton
 Benoit Pierre Emery, fashion designer
 Tracey Emin, artist, 1999 Turner Prize nominee
 Nora England
 Grace English
 Arthur John Ensor, artist and industrial designer
 Helen Escobedo
 Vincent Evans

F

 Wilfred Fairclough
 Steve Fairnie
 Sara Fanelli
 Stephen Farthing
 Cathie Felstead, illustrator
 Sir Luke Fildes, painter
 Anthony Finkelstein
 Archie Fisher (painter)
 Alan Fletcher (graphic designer)
 Marion Foale, fashion designer
 Juan Fontanive
 Elizabeth Forbes (artist)
 Michael Foreman (author/illustrator)
 Gordon Forsyth
 John Foxx
 Barnett Freedman
 Henry Charles Innes Fripp, artist, stained glass maker, illustrator
 Elizabeth Fritsch, ceramic artist, potter
 George Fullard
 Ron Fuller (artist)
 Hamish Fulton
 Holly Fulton
 John Furnival (1933–2020), poet
 Anton Furst, production designer

G

 Jeremy Gardiner
 Margaret Garland
 David Gentleman
 Geoffrey Clarke
 Walter Sykes George, architect
 Bill Gibb
 Evelyn Gibbs, artist
 Jeffrey Gibson
 John Gillard, teacher of advertising and design
 Ernest Gillick
 Mary Gillick, sculptor
 John Gilroy (artist)
 Edna Ginesi
 Gerald Gladstone
 Keith Godwin
 Mick Gold
 Stephen Goldblatt
 Grace Golden, artist
 John Goldschmidt, film director and producer
 Noémie Goudal, photographer
 James Henry Govier, painter, etcher and engraver
 Margaret Green, painter
 Kate Greenaway, illustrator
 Eileen Greenwood, artist and printmaker
 Ernest Greenwood, painter of watercolours
 Helen Frances Gregor
 Eleanor Gribble
 John Griffiths
 Kate Groobey, painter
 Sunil Gupta
 Karen Guthrie
 Richard Guyatt

H

 Elpida Hadzi-Vasileva
 Reginald George Haggar
 Henry Haig
 William Harbutt, sculptor and inventor of Plasticine
 George Hardie (artist)
 Anne Hardy
 Sophie Harley, jewellery designer
 Chris Harrison (photographer)
 Max Hattler, visual artist and animator
 Raymond Hawkey, designer and author
 Thomas Heatherwick, designer and sculptor
 John Hedgecoe, photographer
 Keith Helfet
 Guy Hendrix Dyas, production designer
 Barbara Hepworth, sculptor
 Hubert von Herkomer painter, composer, film maker
 Hilda Hewlett, aviator
 Gert Hildebrand
 Adrian Hill
 Rose Hilton
 Lubaina Himid
 David Hockney, painter
 Rayner Hoff
 Eileen Hogan, painter
 Elizabeth Bradford Holbrook
 Nigel Holmes
 Sigrid Holmwood
 Gerald Holtom
 Peter Horbury
 Percy Horton
 Kathleen Horsman
 Laurence Housman, playwright
 Hitomi Hosono, ceramicist 
 Albert Houthuesen, artist
 Ken Howard (artist)
 Erlund Hudson, artist
 Robert Alwyn Hughes
 Mustafa Hulusi
 Angus Hyland

I

 Kamala Ibrahim
 Bryan Ingham, etcher, painter and sculptor
 Judy Inglis
 James Irvine (designer)
 Keith Irvine
 Runa Islam

J

 Alison Jackson
 Charles Sargeant Jagger
 Apu Jan, fashion designer 
 Merlin James, artist, critic
 Jannuzzi Smith
 James Jarvis (illustrator)
 Gertrude Jekyll, garden designer
 Travis Jeppesen, writer
 Chantal Joffe, painter
 Jasper Joffe, artist
 Laurel Johannesson, painter, multimedia 
 Claude Johnson
 Alfred Garth Jones, illustrator
 Allen Jones, artist
 Barbara Jones (artist)
 Lucy Jones (artist)
 Lily Delissa Joseph
 Betty Jukes, sculptor

K

 Asif Kapadia, film director
 Geeta Kapur
 John Francis Kavanagh Diploma in Sculpture 1928
 Daniel Kearns (designer)
 Patrick Keiller
 Flora Kendrick
 Jonathan Kenworthy, sculptor 
 Morris Kestelman
 Idris Khan
 Rajan Khosa
 Ian Kiaer
 Orla Kiely
 Katharine Kimball
 Ada Florence Kinton
 John Kirby, painter
 R. B. Kitaj, artist
 Alan Kitching, typographer
 Linda Kitson
 Afroditi Krassa
 Henry Krokatsis

L

 Edwin La Dell
 Simon Larbalestier, photographer
 Nora Fry Lavrin
 Geoff Lawson (designer)
 Noel Leaver, painter
 Gilbert Ledward
 Lee Jinjoon, artist
 Lawrence Lee
 Dante Leonelli, artist
 Audrey Levy, designer
 Jessie Lipscomb
 Elizabeth Jane Lloyd
 Mark Lloyd, car designer
 Fiona Lloyd-Davies
 John Hodgson Lobley
 Hew Locke
 Bernard Lodge, graphic designer
 Edwin Lutyens, architect

M

 Frances Macdonald, painter
 Julien Macdonald
 David Mach, 1988 Turner Prize nominee
 Kirsteen Mackay
 Steve Mackey, musician
 Ian Mackenzie-Kerr
 Steve Mackey
 Thomas MacLaren
 Jane McAdam Freud
 Charles Mahoney
 Kate Malone studio potter
 Peter Jacob Maltz, sculptor
 Melanie Manchot
 Edna Mann
 Mick Manning
 Jeremy Marre, film director
 Walter Marsden
 Robert Burkall Marsh
 Kenneth Martin, sculptor
 Mary Martin
 Mary Martin (artist)
 Penny Martin
 Simon Martin (Mayanist)
 Enid Marx
 Benedict Mason
 Robin Mason
 Arthur Max
 Donald Maxwell, artist and illustrator
 Hannah Maybank
 Enda McCallion
 Gerald McCann (fashion designer)
 Christopher McDonnell
 David McFall
 Gerry McGovern
 Colin McNaughton
 Carol McNicoll
 Chris Meigh-Andrews
 Ellen Meijers
 David Mellor, cutler and industrial designer
 Nathaniel Mellors
 Zoë Mendelson
 Mortimer Menpes, artist
 Kobena Mercer
 Gerald Fenwick Metcalfe
 Percy Metcalfe
 Katharine Meynell
 Hilary Miller 
 John W. Mills, sculptor
 Russell Mills, multimedia artist and musician
 Dhruva Mistry
 Crawford Mitchell
 Maggie Mitchell, sculptor
 Ursula Mommens
 Henrietta Montalba, sculptor
 Esther Moore, sculptor
 Henry Moore, sculptor
 Raymond Moore (photographer)
 Erdem Moralioğlu, fashion designer
 Katy Moran
 Harry Morley, artist and illustrator
 Malcolm Morley, 1984 Turner Prize winner
 Jasper Morrison, designer
 Mary Morton, sculptor
 Colin Moss, artist and teacher
 Charles Mozley
 Sophie Muller
 Charlie Murphy (artist)
 Alison Murray
 William Grant Murray
 Peter Musson, silversmith
 Lawrence Mynott

N
 Deborah Nadoolman Landis
 Vera Neubauer
 Rhoda Holmes Nicholls
 Simon Nicholson
 Sarina Nihei, Director and Animator/Illustrator
 Mike Nuttall

O

 Una O'Connor, actor
 Chris Ofili, 1998 Turner Prize winner
 Lucille Oille
 Laura Oldfield Ford
 Marilene Oliver, sculptor
 M. C. Oliver, calligrapher
 Vaughan Oliver, designer and graphic designer
 Chris Orr, English artist
 Christopher Orr, Scottish artist
 Jay Osgerby, designer
 Thérèse Oulton
 Graham Ovenden
 Roy Oxlade, painter
 Lawson Oyekan

P

 Tom Palin, painter
 Lilian Parker, sculptor
 Susan Parkinson, ceramic artist
 Eric Parry
 Stephen Partridge
 John Pasche
 Alicia Paz
 Muriel Pemberton
 Graham Percy
 Peter Phillips (artist)
 Cathie Pilkington
 Michael Pinsky
 John Piper (artist)
 Keith Piper (artist)
 Vivian Pitchforth, painter
 Platon (photographer)
 John Platt (artist)
 Michael Please
 Fergus Pollock
 Constance Mary Pott
 Cherry Potter
 Edward Poynter, artist
 Jane Price, painter
 Margaret Priest
 Simon Pummell
 William Pye (sculptor)

Q
 Brothers Quay, stop-motion animators

R

 Fiona Raby
 Alma Ramsey
 Tissa Ranasinghe
 Eric Ravilious
 Raymond Ray-Jones
 Ruth Raymond
 Mary Remington
 Alan Reynolds (artist)
 Lis Rhodes
 Zandra Rhodes, fashion designer
 Ceri Richards, painter
 Frances Richards (British artist)
 Sophy Rickett, visual artist
 Alan Rickman, actor
 Arthur Dewhurst Riley
 Bridget Riley, artist
 Michael Rizzello
 John Romer (Egyptologist)
 Frank Roper
 Johnny Rozsa, photographer
 Frank Runacres
 Joseph Rykwert

S

 Astrid Sampe
 Kenneth Sandford
 Janek Schaefer, composer
 Tony Scherman
 Herbert Gustave Schmalz
 Peter Schreyer
 Ridley Scott, film director
 Tony Scott, film director
 Florian Seidl
 Uday Shankar, choreographer
 George Shaw (artist), Turner Prize nominee 2011
 Elaine Shemilt
 Clare Shenstone
 Marjorie Sherlock
 Simon Shore
 Stefan Sielaff
 Norman Sillman, coin designer
 John William Simpson
 Lilian Simpson
 Peter Sís, artist and illustrator
 Yvonne Skargon, wood engraver and illustrator
 Mary Annie Sloane
 Walter Smith (art educator)
 Arthur Smith (illustrator)
 Graham Smith (milliner)
 Graham Smith (photographer)
 Jack Smith (artist)
 Martin Smith (designer)
 Martin Smith (potter)
 Paul M. Smith (photographer)
 Richard Smith (artist)
 Walter Smith, industrial art educator
 Susan Weber Soros
 Alan Sorrell, archaeological reconstruction artist
 Ruskin Spear
 A. B. S. Sprigge
 Henry Stannard
 Mary Stainbank
 Julian Stair
 Cecil Stephenson, artist
 Peter Stevens (car designer)
 Stuart Stockdale, fashion designer
 Susan Stockwell
 Tim Stoner
 Paul Stopforth
 Mike Stott
 Madeleine Strindberg
 Linda Sutton, painter, RCA 100 mural prize 1972
 Charles Robinson Sykes

T

 Kam Tang
 Jeremy Tankard
 Eric Taylor
 Leonard Campbell Taylor
 Alice Temperley
 Suzie Templeton, director of animated films, winner of Academy Award 2008
 Patrick Thomas (graphic artist)
 Elizabeth Thompson (Lady Butler), painter
 Storm Thorgerson, photographer and designer
 Jake Tilson, artist
 Joe Tilson, artist
 Sue Timney
 Carl Toms
 Martin Travers, designer, stained glass artist
 Philip Treacy
 David Tremlett, artist, Turner Prize nominee 1992
 Newbury Abbot Trent
 Helen Mabel Trevor
 Ernest William Tristram
 John Tunnard, artist
 Charles Tunnicliffe, painter
 Gavin Turk, artist
 Richard Turner (artist)
 Sidney Tushingham, painter and etcher
 Alice Twemlow
 Mary Fraser Tytler

U
 Michael Upton

V
 Marjan van Aubel
 Dirk van Braeckel
Katrina van Gruow
 Paul Vanstone
 Markus Vater
 Eugenia Vronskaya

W

 Paul Wager, painter and sculptor
 Ray Walker, mural artist, 1945–1984
 Melanie Walsh, children's book illustrator
 Suling Wang, artist
 Albert Watson (photographer)
 Robert Welch (designer)
 Richard Wentworth, sculptor
 David Wheatley (director)
 Fred Whisstock, illustrator
 Valerie Wiffen, painter
 David Wightman (painter)
 Alison Wilding, 1992 Turner Prize nominee
 Christopher Williams (Welsh artist), 1873–1934
 Garth Williams
 Eli Marsden Wilson
 John David Wilson
 Joash Woodrow, painter
 Alice B. Woodward
 Ernest Worrall
 Sönke Wortmann
 Jon Wozencroft, graphic designer
 Andrea Wulf
 Jan Wurm, painter
 Rose Wylie, painter
 Cerith Wyn Evans
 Althea Wynne, sculptor

Y
 Carey Young, artist
 Yuan Cai and Jian Jun Xi

Z
 Astrid Zydower

References

 
Royal College of Art, alumni